The Men's synchronized 10 metre platform competition at the 2017 World Championships was held on 17 July 2017.

Results
The preliminary round was started at 13:00. The final was held at 18:30.

Green denotes finalists

References

Men's synchronized 10 metre platform